Henry Forbes Bigelow (May 12, 1867 – August 12, 1929) was an American architect, best known for his work with the firm of Bigelow & Wadsworth in Boston, Massachusetts. He was noted as an architect of civic, commercial and domestic buildings. In an obituary, his contemporary William T. Aldrich wrote that "Mr. Bigelow probably contributed more to the creation of charming and distinguished house interiors than any one person of his time." Numerous buildings designed by Bigelow and his associates have been listed on the United States National Register of Historic Places (NRHP).

Early life 
Bigelow was born in Clinton, Massachusetts to Henry Nelson Bigelow (1839–1907) and Clarissa Nichols (née Forbes) Bigelow (1841–1876). His father was the managing agent of the Bigelow Carpet Company of Clinton, which had been founded by his father and uncle. His great uncle, Erastus Brigham Bigelow, invented the carpet loom. His maternal grandfather was Franklin Forbes.

He graduated from St. Mark's School in 1884. He then attended the Massachusetts Institute of Technology, graduating with a B.S. in 1888. While there, he was a member of the fraternity of Delta Psi (aka St. Anthony Hall). After graduating from college, he took post-graduate classes in Europe for a year.

Career 
In 1889, Bigelow received his first commission—designing new buildings for St. Mark's School, his preparatory school where his father had been a trustee since 1883. As he lacked a practice of his own, construction of the building was entrusted to architects from the Boston firm of Winslow & Wetherell under George Homans. Wetherell and Walter T. Winslow. Bigelow traveled abroad for several months during construction, and when he returned to Boston he joined Winslow & Wetherell as an architect.

In February 1899, Bigelow became a partner in the firm, which became Winslow, Wetherell & Bigelow. When Wetherell retired in 1900, it became Winslow & Bigelow. Winslow died in January 1909. That same year Philip Wadsworth, a draftsman with the firm since 1907, became partner and Bigelow became senior partner of the renamed Bigelow & Wadsworth. Their offices were located at 3 Hamilton Place in Boston. The partnership was expanded in 1928 to include two architects already working with the firm, Edward A. Hubbard and Giles M. Smith. The firm changed its name to Bigelow, Wadsworth, Hubbard & Smith. He worked there until his death.

Bigelow was an architectural traditionalist, and almost all of his buildings were designed in the Colonial Revival, Second Renaissance Revival, or Gothic Revival styles of architecture, as well as buildings in the related Federal Revival and Tudor Revival styles. Some exceptions appear in his early career, when some of his designs included elements of the English Arts and Crafts style and Italian or Spanish Revival style.

Bigelow designed three mansions for his family. In 1899, he renovated a  house at 1073 Brush Hill Road in Milton, Massachusetts into a stucco Italian villa that the family used as a summer house until 1917. His primary residence was at 142 Chestnut Street on Beacon Hill in Boston. Designed by Bigelow in 1915 in the Italian style, the family mansion featured a large courtyard. In June 1916, an entire issue of The American Architect was dedicated to this house, with eighteen full-page photographs. Another family summer home was Pineapple Court, a Spanish Revival style villa at 89 West Street in Beverly Farms, Massachusetts.

His last work, the Art Deco Ansin Building for the Boston Electric Illuminating Company, was in its final phases of design at the time of his death.

Professional affiliations 
Bigelow became a member of the American Institute of Architects in 1901 and was elected to the College of Fellows in 1905. He was an associate fellow in the Boston Society of Architects and a member of the Boston Architectural Club. In 1917, he was appointed to the Visiting Committee for the School of Architecture at the Massachusetts Institute of Technology.

Starting in 1919, he was a trustee of the Boston Museum of Fine Arts, serving as chairman of the committee on the new wing and as a member of the museum committee. He was also a member of the Boston Art Commission.

Personal life
On October 14, 1896, Bigelow married Eliza Frothingham Davis (1871–1907) in All Saints' Church in Boston. She was the daughter of Maria L. Robbins and the Hon. Edward L. Davis of Boston and Worcester. Their children were Henry Davis Bigelow (1897–1974), Edward Livingston Bigelow (1899-1975) and twins Chandler Bigelow (1900–1987) and Nelson Bigelow (1900–1988). Eliza died in Tours in 1907.

On June 1, 1912, he married Susan Thayer (1885–1942) in Lancaster, Massachusetts. She was a daughter of Susan Spring and Eugene Van Rensselaer Thayer, a member of the wealthy Boston Brahmin Thayer family. His children by the second marriage were Eugene Thayer Bigelow (1913–1990) and Henry Forbes Bigelow Jr. (1922–1944).

He was a member of the Hoosie Whisick in Canton, the Norfolk Hunt Club, the Puritan Club, the Somerset Club, the Tavern Club, and the Union Club of Boston. He was a trustee of St. Marks School and was an Episcopalian.

Bigelow died in 1929 at his summer home in Beverly Farms, Massachusetts at the age of 62.

Selected works

Notes

Gallery of architectural works

References

1867 births
1907 deaths
People from Clinton, Massachusetts
St. Mark's School (Massachusetts) alumni
Massachusetts Institute of Technology alumni
St. Anthony Hall
Architects from Massachusetts
Architects from Boston
20th-century American architects
19th-century American architects
American Episcopalians